The Dunhuang Caves may be one of five archaeological sites around Dunhuang in Gansu:

 Mogao Caves ("Caves of the Thousand Buddhas")
 Western Thousand Buddha Caves
 Eastern Thousand Buddha Caves
 Yulin Caves ("Ten Thousand Buddha Caves")
 Five Temple Caves